

Havelock is a small town in the Marlborough Region of New Zealand, at the head of Pelorus Sound, one of the Marlborough Sounds, and at the mouth of the Pelorus and Kaituna Rivers

State Highway 6 from Nelson to Blenheim passes through the town. Queen Charlotte Drive, which provides a shorter but very winding road to Picton proceeds east along the edge of the Sounds. Picton lies 35 km to the east.

Havelock serves as the centre for much of the New Zealand green-lipped mussel industry, and promotes itself as the greenshell mussel capital of the world. It also functions as the base for a mail boat servicing the remote communities in the Marlborough Sounds, as well as for many fishing and recreational boats.

The name "Havelock" commemorates Sir Henry Havelock (1795-1857), known from the Siege of Lucknow during the Indian Rebellion of 1857. The streets were laid out in 1858, with Lucknow Street as the main thoroughfare.
The gold rush to the Wakamarina Valley in 1864 boosted the growth of the township, with sawmilling becoming the main activity until the 1910s, later joined by dairying. The valleys around Havelock contain many pine plantations.

Across the Kaituna River estuary, the Cullen Point Scenic Reserve
and the Mahakipawa Hill Scenic Reserve
offer a coastal walking-track to a lookout at Cullen Point.

Demographics 
It is part of the wider Marlborough Sounds West statistical area.

Havelock, comprising the SA1 statistical areas of 7023229, 7023230, 7023231 and 7023232, had a population of 588 at the 2018 New Zealand census, an increase of 81 people (16.0%) since the 2013 census, and an increase of 78 people (15.3%) since the 2006 census. There were 234 households. There were 306 males and 279 females, giving a sex ratio of 1.1 males per female, with 84 people (14.3%) aged under 15 years, 75 (12.8%) aged 15 to 29, 273 (46.4%) aged 30 to 64, and 150 (25.5%) aged 65 or older.

Ethnicities were 83.7% European/Pākehā, 15.8% Māori, 2.0% Pacific peoples, 5.6% Asian, and 4.1% other ethnicities (totals add to more than 100% since people could identify with multiple ethnicities).

Although some people objected to giving their religion, 58.7% had no religion, 26.5% were Christian, 2.0% were Buddhist and 2.6% had other religions.

Of those at least 15 years old, 60 (11.9%) people had a bachelor or higher degree, and 117 (23.2%) people had no formal qualifications. The employment status of those at least 15 was that 249 (49.4%) people were employed full-time, 72 (14.3%) were part-time, and 9 (1.8%) were unemployed.

Marlborough Sounds West

Marlborough Sounds West had a population of 1,986 at the 2018 New Zealand census, an increase of 180 people (10.0%) since the 2013 census, and an increase of 96 people (5.1%) since the 2006 census. There were 816 households. There were 1,017 males and 966 females, giving a sex ratio of 1.05 males per female. The median age was 48.3 years (compared with 37.4 years nationally), with 345 people (17.4%) aged under 15 years, 252 (12.7%) aged 15 to 29, 933 (47.0%) aged 30 to 64, and 459 (23.1%) aged 65 or older.

Ethnicities were 90.9% European/Pākehā, 13.1% Māori, 1.8% Pacific peoples, 2.4% Asian, and 2.4% other ethnicities (totals add to more than 100% since people could identify with multiple ethnicities).

The proportion of people born overseas was 15.6%, compared with 27.1% nationally.

Although some people objected to giving their religion, 58.8% had no religion, 29.0% were Christian, 0.9% were Buddhist and 2.3% had other religions.

Of those at least 15 years old, 180 (11.0%) people had a bachelor or higher degree, and 405 (24.7%) people had no formal qualifications. The median income was $27,900, compared with $31,800 nationally. The employment status of those at least 15 was that 762 (46.4%) people were employed full-time, 279 (17.0%) were part-time, and 30 (1.8%) were unemployed.

Education
The school was founded in 1861.

Notable people 
William Pickering, space scientist and former director of NASA's Jet Propulsion Laboratory
Ernest Rutherford, Nobel Prize-winning physicist

See also
Moenui

References

External links

 Havelock School website
 Havelock Community and Information Website
 Havelock Info Centre 

Populated places in the Marlborough Region
Populated places in the Marlborough Sounds